Millpool is a hamlet in the parish of Cardinham in north Cornwall, England, lying about one mile north of Cardinham village. The A30 trunk road towards Bodmin runs about half a mile north-west of the hamlet.

There is another Millpool hamlet in west Cornwall, mostly in Breage parish, but having some properties in St Hilary and Germoe parishes.

References

Hamlets in Cornwall